Farol da Preguiça is a lighthouse located near the shore of Baía de São Jorge in Preguiça on the island of São Nicolau in northern Cape Verde. It is a masonry hut, coloured white. It sits at about 18 meters above sea level in the village, it is seven meters tall and its focal height is at 25 meters above sea level. Its characteristic is Fl (2+1) R 15s.

See also

List of lighthouses in Cape Verde

References

Ribeira Brava, Cape Verde
Lighthouses in Cape Verde
Transport in Cape Verde